Events from the year 1875 in Canada.

Incumbents

Crown 
 Monarch – Victoria

Federal government 
 Governor General – Frederick Hamilton-Temple-Blackwood 
 Prime Minister – Alexander Mackenzie
 Chief Justice – William Buell Richards (Ontario) (from 30 September 1875)
 Parliament – 3rd

Provincial governments

Lieutenant governors 
Lieutenant Governor of British Columbia – Joseph Trutch
Lieutenant Governor of Manitoba – Alexander Morris
Lieutenant Governor of New Brunswick – Samuel Leonard Tilley
Lieutenant Governor of Nova Scotia – Adams George Archibald
Lieutenant Governor of Ontario – John Willoughby Crawford (until May 13) then Donald Alexander Macdonald (from May 18)
Lieutenant Governor of Prince Edward Island – Robert Hodgson
Lieutenant Governor of Quebec – René-Édouard Caron

Premiers 
Premier of British Columbia – George Anthony Walkem
Premier of Manitoba – Robert Atkinson Davis
Premier of New Brunswick – George Edwin King
Premier of Nova Scotia – William Annand (until May 8) then Philip Carteret Hill (from May 11)
Premier of Ontario – Oliver Mowat
Premier of Prince Edward Island – Lemuel Cambridge Owen
Premier of Quebec – Charles Boucher de Boucherville

Territorial governments

Lieutenant governors 
 Lieutenant Governor of the Northwest Territories – Alexander Morris

Events 
January 14 – The Halifax Herald is first published
January 18 – 1875 Ontario election: Sir Oliver Mowat's Liberals win a second consecutive majority
March 1 – The Hospital for Sick Children (Toronto) is founded
April 5 – The Supreme Court of Canada is created
April 8 – The Northwest Territories is given a lieutenant-governor separate from that of Manitoba.
May 11 – Philip Carteret Hill becomes premier of Nova Scotia, replacing William Annand
June 1 – Construction begins on the Canadian Pacific Railway
June 30 – The Land Purchase Act comes into effect in Prince Edward Island in order to address the "land question", one of the issues that had prompted the colony to join Confederation
July 7 – 1875 Quebec election: Charles-Eugène Boucher de Boucherville's Conservatives win a third consecutive majority
July 20 – 1875 British Columbia election
September 2 – The Guibord Affair, violence resulting from the 1874 Guibord case, breaks out

Full date unknown 
 Convent Scandal: During the winter in Montreal, typhoid fever strikes at a convent school. The corpses of the victims are filched by body-snatchers before relatives arrive from America, causing much furor. Eventually the Anatomy Act of Quebec is changed over it.
Louis Riel is granted amnesty with the condition that he be banished for five years.
Jennifer Trout becomes the first woman licensed to practise medicine in Canada, although Emily Stowe has been doing so without a licence in Toronto since 1867
Grace Lockhart receives from Mount Allison University the first Bachelor of Arts degree awarded to a woman.

Births 
February 26 – Edith Jane Miller, concert contralto singer (d. 1936)
March 29 – Harry James Barber, politician (d.1959)
June 12 – Sam De Grasse, actor (d.1953)

June 15 – Herman Smith-Johannsen, ski pioneer and supercentenarian (d.1987)
August 2 – Albert Hickman, politician and 17th Prime Minister of Newfoundland (d.1943)
August 21 – Winnifred Eaton, author (d.1954)
August 22 – François Blais, politician (d.1949)
August 26 – John Buchan, 1st Baron Tweedsmuir, novelist, politician and 15th Governor General of Canada (d.1940)
September 6 – Edith Berkeley, biologist
October 5 – Anne-Marie Huguenin, journalist
November 19 – John Knox Blair, politician, physician and teacher (d.1950)
December 5 – Arthur Currie, World War I general (d.1933)

Deaths 
March 1 – Henry Kellett, officer in the Royal Navy, oceanographer, Arctic explorer (b.1806)
June 22 – William Edmond Logan, geologist (b.1798)
July 15 – Charles La Rocque, priest and third Bishop of Saint-Hyacinthe (b.1809)
July 22 – Amable Éno, dit Deschamps, political figure (b.1785)
August 21 – George Coles, Premier of Prince Edward Island (b.1810)
December 14 – Marie-Anne Gaboury, female explorer (b.1780)

Historical documents
Now in Opposition, J.A. Macdonald and Charles Tupper criticize the Liberal government

Rev. George Bryce details Presbyterian Church's "heathen" mission work among 80,000 Indigenous people in North-West Territories

Painting: Huron-Wendat Chief Telari-o-lin's self-portrait

References
  

 
Years of the 19th century in Canada
Canada, 1875 In
1875 in North America